These are the recent results of the College Basketball on CBS games.

''All rankings are from that week's AP Poll.

2010-11 season

2011-12 season

2012-13 season

2013-14 season

2014–15 season

2015–16 season

2016–17 season

2017–18 season

2018–19 season

2019-20 season

2020-21 season

2021-22 season

2022-23 season

References 

CBS Sports